Ridgeville Township is one of the thirteen townships of Henry County, Ohio, United States. As of the 2010 census the population was 1,091.

Geography
Located in the northwestern corner of the county, it borders the following townships:
German Township, Fulton County - north
Clinton Township, Fulton County - northeast corner
Freedom Township - east
Napoleon Township - southeast corner
Adams Township, Defiance County - south
Tiffin Township, Defiance County - southwest corner
Springfield Township, Williams County - west

Ridgeville Township is the only exception to the county's rectangular shape.  It is the only county township to border Williams County.

No municipalities are located in Ridgeville Township, although the unincorporated community of Ridgeville Corners lies in the township's east.

Name and history
It is the only Ridgeville Township statewide.

Government
The township is governed by a three-member board of trustees, who are elected in November of odd-numbered years to a four-year term beginning on the following January 1. Two are elected in the year after the presidential election and one is elected in the year before it. There is also an elected township fiscal officer, who serves a four-year term beginning on April 1 of the year after the election, which is held in November of the year before the presidential election. Vacancies in the fiscal officership or on the board of trustees are filled by the remaining trustees.

References

External links
County website

Townships in Henry County, Ohio
Townships in Ohio